Fight of My Life is the third full-length album by the Christian third-wave ska band, The Insyderz, and was released in late 1998.

Track listing
 "Jigsaw"
 "What Happened to Joe?"
 "Paradise"
 "The Hunted"
 "Game Day"
 "Trinidad"
 "Rat Race"
 "Just What I Needed"
 "Fight of My Life"
 "Forgive and Forget"

Personnel
Joe Yerke - Lead Vocals
Beau McCarthy - Bass Guitar
Kyle Wasil - Lead Guitar
Nate Sjogren - Drums
Bram Roberts - Trumpet
Sang Kim - Trombone

References

The Insyderz albums
1998 albums